The 2012 Pro Bowl was the National Football League's all-star game for the 2011 season. It took place at 2:00 pm local time on Sunday, January 29, 2012, at Aloha Stadium in Honolulu, Hawaii. The AFC defeated the NFC, 59–41.

The 59 points scored by the AFC team were a Pro Bowl record, and the combined 100 total points was second in the series' history to only the 2004 Pro Bowl. Miami Dolphins wide receiver Brandon Marshall was named the game's Most Valuable Player after catching four touchdown passes, breaking the record for touchdown receptions in a Pro Bowl which was set by Jimmy Smith in 2004.

The AFC team was coached by Gary Kubiak of the Houston Texans while Green Bay Packers head coach Mike McCarthy led the NFC all-stars. The referee for the game was Walt Coleman.

Scoring summary

AFC roster
The following players were selected to represent the AFC:

Offense

Defense

Special teams

NFC roster
The following players were selected to represent the NFC:

Offense

Defense

Special teams

Notes:
bold player who participated in game
Replacement selection due to injury or vacancy
Injured player; selected but will not play
Replacement starter; selected as reserve
"Need player"; named by coach
Selected but did not play because his team advanced to Super Bowl XLVI

Number of selections per team

Broadcasting
The game was televised nationally by NBC. The telecast of the game garnered a Nielsen rating of 7.9 nationally. While this represented an eight percent drop over the 2011 Pro Bowl ratings, the game was still the second most watched Pro Bowl of the past twelve years. The game drew more viewers than the 2011 Major League Baseball All-Star Game. NBC also broadcast the 2013 game as Super Bowl broadcaster CBS had declined to carry it.

Social media
The NFL loosened its rules which forbid players from communicating via social media during games, by setting up a computer on each sideline to allow players to use Twitter. Washington Redskins linebacker London Fletcher used the occasion to propose a contest among his Twitter followers to predict the game's final score and MVP. However, the NFL had him rescind the offer and he instead gave away a signed jersey instead of cash, presumably on anti-gambling grounds.

Entertainment
The pop band Hot Chelle Rae played during the pregame ceremonies for the game. United States Air Force Technical Sergeant Richard Vazquez sang the national anthem before the kickoff. Several representatives of the U.S. Armed Forces participated in the coin toss ceremony: Major General Rodger Mathews, U.S. Army Pacific deputy commander; Lieutenant General Thomas L. Conant, U.S. Marine Corps Pacific command deputy commander and USAF Major General Darryll Wong, adjutant general of the Hawaii Air National Guard. The halftime show, "NFL Salute to Service," was a tribute to the United States Armed Forces featuring the U.S. Army Silent Drill Team along with over a thousand service members stationed at bases in Hawaii.

Reactions
Simon Samano of NFL.com wrote about the game, "Players love the trip to Hawaii but don't care for the game itself. They have no desire to risk injury in a 'meaningless' game, which is why they don't play hard, which is how you end up with 59–41 as the final score. It's that lack of effort that caused fans to boo during portions of this year's game." Green Bay Packers quarterback Aaron Rodgers stated on his radio show, "I was just surprised that some of the guys either didn’t want to play or when they were in there didn't put any effort into it." The Pro Bowl has different rules than a regular season NFL game. Blitzing is not allowed and the 4–3 formation must always be used in defensive formations.

NFL commissioner Roger Goodell, speaking a week after the game, stated that the 2012 Pro Bowl wasn't "the kind of football we want to be demonstrating to our fans, and you heard it from the fans, the fans were actively booing in the stands. ... We are going to either have to improve the quality of what we are doing in the Pro Bowl or consider other changes, or even consider eliminating the game if that is the kind of quality of game we are going to provide."

Philip Rivers also questioned some of the players efforts in the Pro Bowl game. Rivers discussed with Bill Williamson during an interview “In general, maybe the whole week should be up for discussion, but I know there are guys in the game whose contracts may be up and they don’t want to get hurt and things like that. Still, we have to think of the fans and try to stay true to the game and not make a joke or a mockery out of the game."

References

External links
 Official Pro Bowl website at NFL.com

Pro Bowl
Pro Bowl
Pro Bowl
Pro Bowl
Pro Bowl
American football competitions in Honolulu
January 2012 sports events in the United States